This is an alphabetic list of notable people from Iran or its historical predecessors.

In the news

 Ali Khamenei, supreme leader of Iran
 Ebrahim Raisi, president of Iran, former Chief Justice of Iran.
 Hassan Rouhani, former president of Iran (2013–2021)
 Mahmoud Ahmadinejad, former president of Iran (2005–2013)
 Akbar Hashemi Rafsanjani, former politician
 Qasem Soleimani, former commander of the Quds Force
 Ali Larijani, former Speaker of the Parliament of Iran from 2008 to 2020.
 Mohammad Bagher Ghalibaf, former Mayor of Tehran, Speaker of the Islamic Consultative Assembly
 Ali Dizaei, senior officer in the London Metropolitan Police
 Alireza Jafarzadeh, Fox News Channel foreign-affairs analyst
 Anousheh Ansari, space tourist, telecommunication entrepreneur and namesake of the Ansari X Prize
 Bahar Soomekh, Iranian-American actor
 Camila Batmanghelidjh, founder of London-based children's charity Kids Company
 Daryush Shokof, artist Maximalism, film director,
 Reza Pahlavi, son of the deposed Shah of Iran, crown prince in exile.
 Shirin Ebadi, recipient of 2003 Nobel Peace Prize
 Akbar Ganji, Iranian journalist and writer. He has been described as "Iran's preeminent political dissident".

Artists

Calligraphists

 Gholam Hossein Amirkhani
 Abolhassan Etessami
 Mir Emad Hassani
 Seyyed Jafar Kashfi
 Yadollah Kaboli Khansari
 Mishkín-Qalam
 Jalil Rasouli
 amir shfiee
 Mehdi Saeedi
 khosro balali dehkordi
 Mir Ali Tabrizi
 zabiholah mousavi vardanjani

Cartoonists

 Golnar Servatian
 Javad Alizadeh
 Maziyar Bizhani
 Nikahang Kowsar
 Mana Neyestani
 Touka Neyestani

Painters, illustrators and sculptors

 Abolhassan Khan Sadighi
 Ali Akbar Sadeghi
 Amir Shayesteh Tabar
 Aydin Aghdashloo
 Bahram Soroush
 Behdad Najafi Asadollahi
 Daryush Shokof
 Farhad Sadeghi Amini
 Gholamhossein Saber
 Haydar Hatemi
 Hossein Behzad
 Hossein Valamanesh
 Hossein Zenderoudi
 Iran Darroudi
 Jazeh Tabatabai
 Kamal ol-Molk
 Kamaleddin Behzad
 Mahmoud Farshchian
 Mani
 Maryam Hashemi (Maryam Sandjari)
 Mohammad Ali Taraghijah
 Mohsen Vaziri-Moghaddam
 Mokarrameh Ghanbari
 Noreen Motamed
 Afshin Naghouni
 Parviz Tanavoli
 Reza Abbasi
 Shahla Aghapour
 Shahla Arbabi
 Shirazeh Houshiary
 Siah Armajani
 Sohrab Sepehri
 Zhaleh Kazemi

Photographers

 Abbas
 Abbas Kiarostami
 Alfred Yaghobzadeh
 Ali Ghanbari
 Ali Khan Vali
 Jahangir Razmi
 Kaveh Golestan
 Maryam Zandi
 Mitra Tabrizian
 Morteza Avini
 Nader Davoodi
 Nasrollah Kasraian
 Newsha Tavakolian
 Reza Deghati
 Hossein Rajabian
 Sadegh Tirafkan
 Shadi Ghadirian
 Shahram Entekhabi
 Shirana Shahbazi
 Shirin Neshat

Designers

Architects 

 Hossein Amanat
 Kamran Diba
 Heydar Ghiaï-Chamlou
 Fariborz Sahba

Fashion designers 

 Pegah Anvarian
 Bijan
 Shirin Guild
 Arefeh Mansouri
 Behnaz Sarafpour
 Mahla Zamani

Graphic designers 

 Reza Abedini
 Farshid Mesghali
 Morteza Momayez
 Mehdi Saeedi
 Ghobad Shiva
 Mohammad mohammadi

Business

 Kia Joorabchian, businessman
 Nasser David Khalili, billionaire and art collector

Entertainers

Comedians

 Baba Ali, Islamic comedy
 Max Amini
 Omid Djalili
 Negin Farsad
 Shahin Jamie
 Maz Jobrani
 Shaparak Khorsandi
 Hadi Khorsandi
 Ebrahim Nabavi
 Nasim Pedrad
 Neema Nazeri

Dancers and choreographers

 Jamileh
 Farzaneh Kaboli, folkloric
 Nima Kiann
 JAMILEH KHARAZI, BALERIAN
 Shahrokh Moshkin Ghalam, folkloric

Models, beauty pageant 

 Nazanin Afshin-Jam, actress, singer-songwriter, human-rights activist; Miss World 2003 first runner-up; Miss Canada 2003
 Ramona Amiri, Miss Canada 2005
 Sahar Biniaz (born 1985), Miss Universe Canada 2012
 Aylar Lie (born 1984), Iranian-born Norwegian actress, model, singer, former pornographic actress
 Shermine Shahrivar, Miss Europe 2005
 Samantha Tajik (born 1983), Miss Universe Canada 2008

Film actors

 Akbar Abdi
 Ali Mosaffa
 Ali Nassirian
 Amin Hayaee
 Amirhossein Arman
 Artemis Pebdani
 Azita Hajian
, Iranian Director
, Iranian Actor
 Bahar Soomekh
 Bahram Radan
 Behrouz Vossoughi
 Behzad Farahani
 Bijan Daneshmand
 Bita Farrahi
 Bizhan Emkanian
 Catherine Bell
 Christiane Amanpour
 Daryoush Arjmand
 Daryush Shokof
 Davoud Rashidi
 Delkash
 Ezzatollah Entezami
 Faramarz Gharibian
 Farimah Farjami
 Fatemeh Motamed-Aria
 Golab Adineh
 Golshifteh Farahani
 Googoosh
 Hamed Behdad
 Hedyeh Tehrani
 Homa Rousta
 Homayoun Ershadi
 Jahangir Forouhar
 Jamileh Sheykhi
 Jamshid Mashayekhi
 Kamshad Kooshan
 Kazem HajirAzad
 Khosrow Shakibaee
 Leila Forouhar
 Leila Hatami
 Mahaia Petrosian
 Mahnaz Afshar
 Majid Majidi
 Maz Jobrani
 Mehdi Fat'hi
 Mehdi Hashemi
 Mehran Modiri
 Merila Zarei
 Mohammad Ali Fardin
 Mohammad Ali Keshavarz
 Mohammad Reza Foroutan
 Mohammad Reza Golzar
 Mohammad Reza Sharifinia
 Navid Mohammadzadeh
 Nazanin Afshin-Jam
 Nematollah Aghasi
 Niki Karimi
 Parsa Pirouzfar
 Parviz Fannizadeh
 Parviz Parastouee
 Parviz Sayyad
 Pegah Ahangarani
 Primus Yustisio
 Reza Kianian
 Reza Rahardian
 Roxanne Pallett
 Roya Nonahali
 Saeed Rad
 Sarah Shahi
 Shaghayegh Farahani
 Shahab Hosseini
 Shohreh Aghdashloo
 Sussan Taslimi
 Taraneh Alidousti
 Zahra Amir Ebrahimi
 Asghar Farhadi, Oscar winner

Theatre and stage actors 

 Mehdi Bajestani
 Taha Behbahani
 Mohsen Shah Ebrahimi
 Behzad Farahani
 Shamsi Fazlollahi
 Ali Nassirian
 Hayley Tamaddon
 Kazem HajirAzad
 Ahmad Saatchian
 Mohammad Reza Jozi
 Ramin Karimloo
 Roya Teymourian
 Shiva Boloorian

Filmmakers, directors

Filmmakers 

 Abbas Kiarostami, director of Taste of Cherry
 Abdolhossein Sepanta
 Hassan Hajgozar
 Abolfazl Jalili
 Ali Ardekani
 Ali Hatami
 Ali Sajadi Hoseini
 Amir Naderi
 Asghar Farhadi, director of A Separation
 Babak Payami
 Bahman Farman-Ara
 Bahman Ghobadi, director of A Time for Drunken Horses
 Bahman Maghsoudlou
 Bahram Beizai
 Behrooz Gharibpoor
 Darius Khondji
 Darius Mehrjui
 Daryush Shokof, director of Seven Servants and Iran Zendan
 Desiree Akhavan, director of Appropriate Behavior
 Ebrahim Hatamikia
 Emud Mokhberi, Academy Award-nominated director and animator
 Esma'il Kooshan
 Houman Seyyedi
 Iraj Ghaderi
 Jafar Panahi, director of The Circle
 Kamal Tabrizi
 Kami Asgar
 Kamran Shirdel
 Kamshad Kooshan
 Khosrow Sinai
 Kiarash Anvari
Kiumars Pourahmad
 Mahdi Bemani Naeini
 Majid Majidi, director of Children of Heaven
 Masoud Kimiai
 Mehran Modiri
 Mohsen Makhmalbaf, director of Kandahar
 Nasser Taghvai
 Parviz Kimiavi
 Hossein Rajabian, director of The Upside-down Triangle
 Parviz Nouri
 Shabnam Rezaei
 Parviz Shahbazi
 Parviz Sayyad
 Bob Yari, Iranian-born American film producer 
 Pouran Derakhshandeh, award-winning film director and producer
, Iranian Director 
 Rakhshan Bani-Etemad
 Ramin Farahani
 Rasoul Mollagholipour
 Reza Badiyi
 Sadaf Foroughi
 Samira Makhmalbaf, director of At Five in the Afternoon
 Samuel Khachikian
 Sohrab Shahid-Sales
 Saeed Roustayi
 Tina Gharavi

Theatre and stage directors 

 Akbar Radi
 Bahram Bayzai
 Behrouz Gharibpour
 Ghotbeddin Sadeghi
 Hengameh Mofid
 Hossein Rajabian
 Mohammad Yaghoubi
 Mostafa Oskooyi
 Reza Shirmarz
 Shiva Boloorian

Musicians and singers

Classical

Iranian classical traditional 

 Abolhasan Saba
 Alireza Eftekhari
 Alinaghi Vaziri
 Dariush Eghbali
 Elaheh
 Gholam-Hossein Banan
 Hana Kamkar
 Homayoun Shajarian
 Hossein Khaje Amiri
 Hossein Tehrani
 Hossein Alizadeh
 Jalal Zolfonun
 Javad Maroofi
 Kamkarha
 Kayhan Kalhor
 Mahmoud Zoulfonoun
 Marzieh
 Maryam Akhondy
 Mirza Abdollah Farahani
 Mohammad Reza Lotfi
 Mohammad Shams
 Mohammad-Reza Shajarian
 Mohsen Namjoo
 Morteza Hannaneh
 Mehdi Rajabian
 Nashit
 Nur Ali Elahi
 Parisa
 Parviz Meshkatian
 Parviz Yahaghi
 Ruhollah Khaleghi
 Shahram Nazeri
 Sima Bina
 Zyriab

Modern traditional 

 Ahmad Pejman
 Axiom of Choice
 Farhad Fakhreddini
 Morteza Hannaneh
 Niyaz
 Ramin Rahimi
 Zohreh Jooya
 Mehdi Rajabian

Western classical 

 Ali Rahbari
 Alireza Mashayekhi
 Amin Homaei
 Aminollah Hossein
 Anoushiravan Rohani
 Armik
 Hangi Tavakoli
 Heshmat Sandjari
 Lily Afshar
 Loris Tjeknavorian (Loris Cheknavarian)
 Lotfi Mansouri
 Mahan Esfahani
 Sahba Aminikia
 Mehdi Hosseini
 Nader Mashayekhi
 Reza Najfar
 Shahrdad Rohani
 Hooman Khalatbari

Electronic 

 Ali "Dubfire" Shirazinia
 Ali Movasat (DJ Aligator)
 Ashkan Kooshanejad
 Deep Dish
 Leila Arab
 Sharam Tayebi
 Steve Naghavi from And One

Pop 
(Sorted according to the first letter of the name)

 May J.
 Afshin
 Alireza Assar
 Alireza Afkari
 Alireza Talischi
 Andy Madadian
 Anousheh Khalili
 Arash
 Aref
 Arian Band
 Bijan Mortazavi
 Darius Danesh
 Dariush Eghbali
 Delkash
 Ebi (Ebrahim Hamedi)
 Faramarz Aslani
 Farhad
 Fereidoun Foroughi
 Googoosh
 Habib
 Hassan Sattar
 Hassan Shamaizadeh
 Hayadeh
 Homeyra
 Kouros
 Leila Forouhar
 Mahasti
 Mansour
 Mehrdad
 Moein
 Mohammad Esfahani
 Mohammad Nouri
 Omid
 Pyruz
 Reza Sadeghi
 Sepideh
 Shadmehr Aghili
 Shahkar Binesh Pazhooh
 Shahram Shabpareh
 Shahrum K
 Shahram BozorgMehr
 Shohreh Solati
 Siavash Ghomeyshi
 Siavash
 Susan Roshan
 Vigen

Rap music 

 Amir Tataloo
 Hichkas
 Yas
 Zedbazi
 Yas
 Shahin Najafi
 Bahram
 Erfan
 Hangi Tavakoli, Multi-Platinum music producer and songwriter

Lyricists 

 Aref Ghazvini
 Hangi Tavakoli 
 Hossein Monzavi
 Leila Kasra
 Maryam Heydarzadeh
 Rahim Moeini Kermanshahi
 Shahyar Ghanbari

Rock and metal 

 Amir Derakh, from the band Orgy
 Angband
 Barad
 Kiosk
 Az Shanbe

Film score composers 

 Hossein Alizadeh
 Ramin Djawadi
 Hangi Tavakoli
 Fariborz Lachini
 Ahmad Pejman
 Peyman Yazdanian
 Mehdi Rajabian

Journalists, media

Bloggers

 Hossein Derakhshan
 Massoumeh Ebtekar
 Mehdi Jami
 Mohammad Ali Abtahi
 Mojtaba Saminejad
 Omid Memarian
 Sina Motalebi

Journalists

 Akbar Ganji
 Ali Akbar Abdolrashidi
 Ali Akbar Dehkhoda
 Alireza Jafarzadeh
 Alireza Nourizadeh
 Arash Markazi
 Azadeh Ensha, The New York Times
 Azadeh Moaveni
 Christiane Amanpour
 Ebrahim Nabavi
 Emadeddin Baghi
 Farjam Behnam
 Farrokhi Yazdi, Pahlavi era
 Hashem Aghajari
 Hossein Shariatmadari
 Kaveh Golestan, BBC
 Kioumars Saberi Foumani
 Mahshid Amirshahi
 Masih Alinejad
 Masoud Dehnamaki
 Massoud Behnoud
 Mehran Ghassemi
 Mirzadeh Eshghi
 Hossein Rajabian
 Mohammad Taghi Bahar
 Nikahang Kowsar
 Omid Memarian
 Rudi Bakhtiar
 Saeed Hajjarian
 Saeed Kamali Dehghan
 Shadi Sadr
 Sina Motallebi
 Youness Shokrkhah
 Maziar Bahari
 Saeed Kamali Dehghan
 Kasra Nouri
 Mohammad Mosaed

News anchors

 Adel Ferdosipour, football announcer, Navad program
 Ali Akbar Abdolrashidi, correspondent, commentator, anchorman
 Mehrdad Kia, T.V. and Radio Broadcaster and executive producer in television and music industry.
 Alireza Jafarzadeh, Foreign Affairs Analyst, Fox News
 Asieh Namdar, news anchor at CNN
 Christiane Amanpour, television journalist, CNN
 Fereydoun Farrokhzad, TV personality and opposition figure
 Jian Ghomeshi, musician, writer, and former CBC radio broadcaster
 Maryam Namazi, news anchor at Al Jazeera (English section)
 Reza Fazeli, actor, film director and opposition figure
 Rudi Bakhtiar, news anchor, formerly with CNN and Fox News

Leaders, politicians, activists

This list excludes royalty, which can be accessed by the main article link above.

Historical 

 Cyrus the Great, Iranian emperor And the founder of Iran
 Nader Shah, Iranian king and military commander
 Darius the Great, Iranian emperor 
 Mithridates I of Parthia, Iranian emperor 
 Ismail I, Iranian king
 Fazlollah Noori, conservative clergy opposing Constitutionalists; hanged
 Ghaem Magham Farahani, prime minister
 Hassan-e-Sabbah, sectarian political leader
 Kaveh the Blacksmith, mythical leader and liberator against the rule of Zahhak, an Arab king
 Mahmud Khan Puladeen, senior military general
 Maziar, son of Karan; leader of the Persian uprising against Arabs
 Mirza Kuchek Khan, constitutionalist leader of Guilan
 Mirza Mehdi Khan Astarabadi, Nader Shah's Chief Minister
 Mirza Reza Kermani, assassinated Nasereddin Shah
 Mohammad Khiabani, popular leader during Constitutionalist Revolution
 Mohammad Mossadegh, prime minister
 Mostowfi ol-Mamalek, prime minister
 Nosrat Dowleh Firouz Mirza, provincial governor
 Safi-ad-din Ardabili, spiritual founder of Safavid dynasty
 Sattar Khan, constitutionalist leader
 Heshmat Taleqani, Jangali leader and ally of Mirza Kuchek Khan

 Abbas the Great

Modern (post-Qajar)

Pahlavi period

 Abdol Hossein Hamzavi, Iranian diplomat, author and representative to the United Nations
 Abdol Karim Ayadi, personal physician to Reza Pahlavi
 Ali Akbar Davar, minister, and founder of Iran's modern judiciary system
 Ali Akbar Siassi, Chancellor of Tehran University
 Ali Gholi Ardalan, Iranian ambassador to the US, West Germany and the USSR
 Amanullah Jahanbani, senior military leader, and father-in-law of Christiane Amanpour's father
 Amir Abdollah Tahmasebi, military leader
 Ardeshir Zahedi
 Bahram Aryana, military commander
 Ahmad Ahmadi, prison interrogator
 Farokhroo Parsa, minister of education
 George Malek-Yonan, procured a seat in Iran's Parliament for Assyrians as a recognized minority
 Hasan Arfa, Army General, Ambassador to Russia, Ambassador to Turkey
 Hassan Modarres, member of Parliament
 Hassan Pakravan, head of SAVAK
 Heidar Arfaa, Conseiller d'État, Minister of Agriculture, Député-Majlis Fars Province
 Hossein Fardoust, deputy head of SAVAK
 Hossein Fatemi, Minister of Foreign Affairs
 Hushang Ansary, Minister of Finance, President of NIOC
 Karim Buzarjomehri, Army General military aide of Reza Shah, Mayor of Tehran
 Mahmoud Jafarian, head of National Iranian Radio and Television and Pars News Agency
 Mahmoud Khayami, industrialist
 Mahmud Mahmud, politician
 Manucher Mirza Farman Farmaian, director of sales for NIOC and Ambassador to Venezuela
 Mohammad Ali Keshavarz Sadr, Mossadegh's Deputy and a leader of the Second National Front
 Nader Jahanbani, air force general, pilot
 Nasser Moghaddam, head of SAVAK
 Nematollah Nassiri, head of SAVAK
 Abbas Mirza Farman Farmaian, Minister of Parliament
 Sattareh Farman Farmaian, established first social worker schools in Iran
 Sepahbod Ahmad Amir-Ahmadi, military leader
 Seyyed Zia'eddin Tabatabaee
 Shapour Bakhtiar, prime minister
 Soraya Esfandiary Bakhtiari
 Teymour Bakhtiar, head of SAVAK
 Abdolhossein Teymourtash, Iranian statesman
 Mirza Javad Khan Ameri, Minister, MP

Served in Islamic Republic government

 Abdolkarim Mousavi-Ardabili
 Abdollah Noori, minister of interior
 Abdollah Ramezanzadeh, government spokesman
 Abdolvahed Mousavi-Lari, minister of interior
 Abolhassan Banisadr, president
 Ahmad Jannati, chair of Council of Guardians
 Ahmad Khatami
 Ahmad Khomeini
 Ahmad Tavakkoli, minister of labour
 Akbar Torkan, minister of roads and transportation
 Ala'eddin Boroujerdi, member of parliament
 Ali Akbar Hashemi Rafsanjani, president
 Ali Akbar Mohtashamipour, member of parliament
 Ali Akbar Nategh-Nouri, speaker of parliament
 Ali Akbar Salehi
 Ali Fallahian, minister of intelligence
 Ali Khamenei, supreme leader
 Ali Larijani, president of IRIB
 Ali Meshkini, chair of Assembly of Experts
 Ali Movahhedi-Kermani
 Ali Shamkhani, minister of defence
 Ali Younessi, minister of information
 Alireza Noori, member of parliament
 Asadollah Lajevardi

 Ata'ollah Mohajerani, minister of culture and Islamic guidance
 Ayatollah Amini, deputy chair of Assembly of Experts
 Ayatollah Mohammadi-Gilani
 Ayatollah Sane'i
 Ayatollah Va'ez-Tabasi
 Ayatollah Mohammad Taghi Mesbah Yazdi
 Behzad Nabavi, vice speaker of parliament
 Bizhan Namdar-Zangeneh, minister of oil
 Ebrahim Asgharzadeh
 Ebrahim Yazdi, foreign minister of interim government
 Elaheh Koulai, member of parliament
 Emad Afrough, member of parliament
 Faezeh Hashemi Rafsanjani, member of parliament
 Fatemeh Haghighatjou, member of parliament
 Gholam Ali Haddad-Adel, speaker of parliament
 Gholam Hossein Elham
 Ghorbanali Dorri-Najafabadi, minister of intelligence

 Grand Ayatollah Hossein-Ali Montazeri
 Hadi Khamenei, member of parliament
 Hamid Reza Assefi, foreign affairs spokesman
 Hassan Habibi, first vice president
 Hassan Rouhani, former president

 Hossein Shariatmadari
 Iraj Fazel, minister of health

 Ezzatollah Zarghami, president of IRIB
 Kamal Daneshyar, member of the Islamic Consultative Assembly
 Kamal Kharrazi, minister of foreign affairs
 Kazem Jalali, politician
 Kazem Rajavi, politician
 Kazem Seddiqi, politician
Lotfollah Forouzandeh (born 1961) Iranian Politician

 Mahmoud Ahmadinejad, former president
 Mahmoud Hashemi Shahroudi, former chief justice
 Majid Ansari, member of parliament
 Manuchehr Eliasi, Jewish member of parliament
 Masoud Pezeshkian, minister of health
 Masoumeh Ebtekar, vice president
 Mehdi Bazargan, prime minister
 Mehdi Hashemi
 Mehdi Karroubi, speaker of parliament
 Mir-Hossein Mousavi, prime minister
 Mohammad Abaee-Khorasani, member of parliament
 Mohammad Ali Abtahi, vice president
 Mohammad Ali Najafi, minister of education
 Mohammad Ali Rajai, president
 Mohammad Beheshti, head of judiciary
 Mohammad Emami-Kashani
 Mohammad Hashemi Rafsanjani
 Mohammad Javad Bahonar, prime minister
 Mohammad Javad Larijani, member of parliament
 Mohammad Khatami, president
 Mohammad Reyshahri
 Mohammad Reza Aref, first vice president
 Mohammad Reza Bahonar, vice speaker of parliament
 Mohammad Reza Khatami, deputy speaker of parliament
 Mohammad Reza Mahdavi-Kani
 Mohammad Sattarifar, vice president
 Mohammad Yazdi, head of judiciary
 Mohsen Armin, member of parliament
 Mohsen Mirdamadi, member of parliament
 Mohsen Nourbakhsh, head of Central Bank of Iran
 Mohsen Rezaee, member of Expediency Discernment Council
 Mohsen Safaee-Farahani, member of parliament and head of Iranian Football Federation
 Mohseni-Ezhe'i

 Morteza Motahhari
 Mostafa Chamran, Minister of Defense
 Mostafa Tajzadeh, deputy minister of interior
 Nasrollah Jahangard, chair of Supreme Council of ICT
, Iranian Politician
, Iranian politician
, Iranian Politician

, Iranian politician
Ghodratollah Norouzi, Iranian politician
 Rahim Safavi

 Rasoul Montajebnia, member of parliament
, Iranian Politician

 Ruhollah Hosseinian

Ruhollah Khomeini, supreme leader, founder of the Islamic Republic

 Sadegh Ghotbzadeh, minister of foreign affairs
 Sadegh Khalkhali, Sharia ruler
 Sadegh Larijani
 Saeed Emami, vice minister of intelligence
 Saeed Hajjarian, Tehran council member
 Saeed Mortazavi
 Seyed Mohammad Hossein Adeli, head of Central Bank of Iran, Ambassador to United Kingdom
, Iranian Politician
, Iranian Politician
Zia-Allah Ezazi Maleki, Iranian Politician

Not served in Islamic Republic government or opposition 

 Abbas Amir-Entezam
 Abdolrahman Ghasemlou
 Abolghasem Kashani
 Ahmad Zirakzadeh
 Ali Shariati, sociologist
 Ali Latifiyan, Iranian writer
 Alireza Rajaei
 Asghar Parsa
 Azam Taleghani
 Bijan Jazani
 Dariush Forouhar
 Daryush Shokof, director of films Iran Zendan and Hitler's Grave
 Ezzatollah Sahabi
 Gholam-Hossein Sadighi
 Habibollah Peiman
 Hashem Aghajari
 Jafar Pishevari
 Mahmoud Taleghani
 Mansoor Hekmat
 Maryam Rajavi
 Massoud Rajavi, militant opposition leader
 Mehdi Khalaji
 Mohsen Sazegara
 Mousa Sadr
 Nasser Zarafshan
 Navvab Safavi, militant cleric
 Parviz Varjavand
 Reza Alamouti, Central Committee Member of the Organization of Iranian People's Fedai Guerrillas; founder of Radio Aras
 Roozbeh Farahanipour, founder of Marze Por Gohar
 Shirin Ebadi, recipient of 2003 Nobel Peace Prize
 Yadollah Sahabi

Politicians in other nations

 Goli Ameri, United States Assistant Secretary of State for Educational and Cultural Affairs
 Benazir Bhutto, former Prime Minister of Pakistan; half-Iranian (mother Nusrat Bhutto)
 Nusrat Bhutto, former first lady of Pakistan
 Jimmy Delshad, mayor of Beverly Hills, California
 George Deukmejian, former Governor of California
 Dan Halutz, Chief of Staff of the Israeli Defense Forces
 Saadat Khan, first Nawab of Oudh in India
 Farah Karimi, Iranian female Dutch Member of Parliament
 Moshe Katsav, former President of Israel
 Tahia Kazem, former first lady of Egypt, wife of President Gamal Abdel Nasser
 Omid Nouripour, member of the German parliament (Bundestag), Germany
 Ross Mirkarimi, former member of San Francisco City Council from Green Party; American of Iranian and Russian descent.
 Reza Moridi, member of the Legislative Assembly of Ontario, Canada
 Shaul Mofaz, Israeli Minister of Transport and a Deputy Prime Minister, and former Minister of Defense
 Wajid Ali Shah, last Nawab of Oudh, disposed of by the British East India Company
 Maryam Yazdanfar, member of the Swedish parliament (Riksdag), Sweden

Activists 

 Mahnaz Afkhami (born 1941), politician and human rights and women's rights activist, served in the Cabinet of Iran (1976–1978)
 Neda Agha-Soltan (1983–2009), shot during the 2009 Iranian election protests; her name quickly became a rallying cry for the opposition
 Bibi Khatoon Astarabadi (1858/9 – 1921), author and pioneer of the Persian women's movement in modern Iran
 Shiva Nazar-Ahari, human-rights activist

Prisoners and detainees 

 Zahra Bani Ameri (1980–2007), physician, died in a prison in Hamedan after being arrested for breaching modesty laws by sitting in a park with her fiancée.
 Zahra Amir Ebrahimi (born 1981), photographer, television actress, subject of a 2006 sex tape scandal in Iran
 Zeynab Jalaliyan, Kurdish prisoner
 Zahra Kazemi, Iranian-Canadian freelance photographer, who according to the medical examiner was raped, tortured and killed by Iranian officials following her arrest in Iran.
 Hossein Rajabian, imprisoned filmmaker
 Nasser Fahimi, a doctor from Kurdistan, a political and ideological prisoner
 Mehdi Rajabian, imprisoned musician

Literature figures

Authors and poets

 See main list: List of Persian-language poets and authors

Translators

 Abdolmajid Eskandari, academic and translator
 Ali Akbar Abdolrashidi, author and translator
 Karim Emami, author and translator
 Majid M. Naini, author and translator
 Mohammad Ghazi, translator
 Shahrokh Meskoob, author and translator

Religious figures
See List of Marjas.
See List of Ayatollahs.

 Majlesi
 The Báb, Prophet-Founder of the Bábi Faith
 Bahá'u'lláh, Prophet-Founder of the Bahá'í Faith
 'Abdu'l-Bahá, Centre of the Covenant of the Bahá'í Faith
 Ganzibra Jabbar Choheili (1923–2014),  head of the Mandaean community in Iran until his death in 2014.
 Rishama Salah Choheili, Iranian Mandaean who is the current patriarch and head of the Mandaean community in Australia
 Haik Hovsepian Mehr, bishop and Christian martyr
 Jamal al-Din Asadabadi
 Mani, founder of Manichaeism
 Mazdak, Religious and Social Reformer
 Meher Baba, Indian spiritual master born to Iranian immigrant parents
 Hamza ibn-'Ali ibn-Ahmad, founder of the Druze
 Muhammad ibn Ismail ad-Darazi
 Mulla Sadra
 Saeed Abedini, Iranian American Christian pastor
 Safi-ad-din Ardabili
 Salman the Persian
 Zahed Gilani
 Zayn al-Din Taybadi (died 1389) mystic and Sufi
 Zoroaster, prophet
 Imam Tawhidi, Australian Iman of Arabian and Iranian descent

Shia Clergy

Abbas Ali Akhtari
Abbas-Ali Amid Zanjani

Abbas-Ali Soleimani
Abbas Amirifar
Abbas Hosseini Kashani
Abbas Ka'bi
Abbas Mahfouzi

Abbas Almohri
Mohammad Montazeri

Seyed Abbas Mousavi Motlagh
Abbas Tabrizian
Abbas Vaez-Tabasi
Abdul Fattah Nawab

Abdol Hossein Dastgheib
Abdul Hussein Mo'ezzi
Abdol Javad Alamolhoda

Abdul Karim Farhani
Abdolkarim Hasheminejad
Abdul Karim Haghshenas
Abdul-Karim Mousavi Ardebili
Seyyed Abdollah Fateminia

Abd al-A'la al-Sabziwari
Abdollah Javadi-Amoli
Abdullah Musawi Shirazi
Abdollah Nouri

Abdul-Majid al-Khoei

Abdolmoghim Nasehi
Abdul-Nabi Mousavi Fard
Abdul-Nabi Namazi
Ayatollah Abdul Rahman Heidari Ilami

Abdolvahed Mousavi Lari

Seyed Abolfazl Mousavi Tabrizi

Abulhassan Navab
Abolghasem Khazali

Abu al-Qasim al-Khoei
Abolghasem Wafi Yazdi

Ahmad Alamolhoda
Ahmad Azari Qomi
Ahmad Beheshti

Ahmad Hosseini Khorasani
Ahmad Jannati
Ahmad Khatami
Ahmad Khomeini
Ahmad Khonsari
Ahmad Marvi
Ahmad Mazani
Ahmad Moballeghi
Ahmad Mohseni Garakani
Ahmad Mojtahedi Tehrani

Ahmad Ghabel
Mir Ahmad Reza Hajati
Seyyed Ahmad Reza Shahrokhi

Ahmad Salek
Ahmad Vaezi

Akbar Hashemi Rafsanjani

Ali Akbar al-Modarresi
Ali Meshkini
Ali-Akbar Hosseini

Ali Akbar Masoudi Khomeini
Ali Akbar Mohtashamipur

Ali Akbar Ghoreishi

 
Ali Akbar Nategh-Nouri
Ali Akbar Rashad
Ali al-Sabziwari

Seyed Ali Asghar Dastgheib

Ali Asghar Rahimi Azad
Ali Asghar Rahmani Khalili
Ali Banaei
Ali Fallahian
Ali Davani

Ali Golzadeh Ghafouri

Ali al-Sistani

Ali Khamenei

Ali Mohammad Dastgheib Shirazi

Ali Orumian
Ali Qazi Askar
Ali Qoddusi

Alireza Arafi

Alireza Panahian
Alireza Qaeminia
Alireza Salimi (politician)
Ali Safi Golpaygani
Seyyed Ali Shafiei
Ali Shirazi

Asadollah Bayat-Zanjani
Assad-Allah Imani

Mir Asadollah Madani
Asgar Dirbaz
Ataollah Ashrafi Esfahani
Azizollah Khoshvaght

Fakhreddin Mousavi
 

Gholam Ali Safai Bushehri
Mohammad Mohammadi Golpayegani
Gholam-Hossein Mohseni-Eje'i

Gholamreza Hassani
Gholamreza Mesbahi Moghaddam
Gholamreza Rezvani

Habibollah Ashouri

Habib Boromand Dashghapu
Hadi al-Modarresi

Hadi Khamenei
Hadi Khosroshahi
Hadi Ghabel
Hadi Ghaffari
Hadi Rohani
Hamid Rasai
Hamid Shahriari
Mirza Hashem Amoli
Hashem Bathaie Golpayegani

Hashem Hashemzadeh Herisi
Hashem Hosseini Bushehri

Hasanali Morvarid
Hasan Ali Nejabat Shirazi
Hassan Ameli
Hassan Emami
Hassan Hassanzadeh Amoli
Hassan Eslami Ardakani
Hassan Khomeini

Hassan Namazi

Hassan Rouhani
Hassan Sanei

Hassan Tabatabaei Qomi

Heydar Moslehi
Hussein-Ali Montazeri

Hossein Borujerdi
Hossein Ansarian

Hossein Ayatollahi

Hossein Kazemeyni Boroujerdi
Hossein Lankarani
Hossein Mazaheri

Hossein Mousavi Tabrizi
Hossein Noori Hamedani

Hossein Taeb
Hossein Wahid Khorasani
Ebrahim Amini
Mir Ebrahim Seyyed Hatami
Ebrahim Raisi

Esmaeil Khatib
Seyed Esmaeil Mousavi Zanjani

Jafar Sobhani
Jafar Shojouni
Jalaleddin Taheri

Javad Gharavi Aliari

Javad Khamenei
Jawad Tabrizi
Javad Mojtahed Shabestari

Karamatollah Malek-Hosseini
Khalil Boyukzadeh
Khalil Mobasher Kashani
Seyed Kazem Seyed Bagheri

Kazem Nourmofidi
Kazem Seddiqi
Lotfollah Dezhkam
Lotfollah Safi Golpaygani
Mahmoud Taleghani
Mahmoud Alavi

Mahmoud Hashemi Shahroudi

Mahmoud Mar'ashi Najafi

Mahmoud Nabavian

Mahmoud Salavati
Mahdi al-Modarresi

Mahdi Hosseini Rohani
Mehdi Karroubi

Seyed Mehdi Ghoreishi
Mehdi Shabzendedar Jahromi

Majid Ansari

Mansour Leghaei
Masoud Khamenei
Ali Younesi

Mohammad-Ali Abtahi
Mohammad Ali Ale-Hashem
Mohammad-Ali Angaji
Mohammad Ali Araki

Mohammad Ali Gerami Qomi

Mohammad Alavi Gorgani
Mohammad Ali Esmaeelpoor Ghomsheie

Mohammad Ali Mousavi Jazayeri

Ali Movahedi-Kermani
Mohammad Ali Qazi Tabatabaei
Mohammad-Ali Rahmani

Mohammad-Ali Shahidi 

Mohammad Ali Shomali
Mohammad-Ali Taskhiri

Mohammad-Bagher Bagheri

Mohammad Bagher Kharazi

Mohammed Emami-Kashani

Mohammad Fazel Lankarani
Mohammad Feyz Sarabi

Mohammad Hadi Ghazanfari Khansari

Mohammad-Hassan Aboutorabi Fard
Mohammad Hassan Ahmadi Faqih

Mohammad Hassan Ghadrdan Gharamaleki
Mohammad Hassan Rahimian

Mohammad Beheshti

Mohammad Hussaini Shahroudi

Seyyed Mohammad Hosseini Zanjani
Muhammad Husayn Tabatabai

Mohammad Ebrahim Jannaati

Mohammad Ezodin Hosseini Zanjani

Mohammad Jafar Montazeri
Muhammad Jafar Moravej
Muhammad Javad Haj Ali Akbari
Mohammad-Javad Bahonar
Mohammad Javad Pishvai

Mohammed Kadhim al-Modarresi
Mohammad Kazem Shariatmadari
Mohammad Khamenei
Mohammad Khatami

Mehdi Tabatabaei
Mohammad Mofatteh

Mohammad Mohammadi Gilani
Mohammad Momen
Mohammad Mousavi Khoeiniha
Mohammad Mofti al-shia Mousavi

Nasser Biria
Mohammad Qomi
Mohammad Rahmati Sirjani

Mohammad Reyshahri

Mohammad-Reza Ashtiani Araghi

Mohammad-Reza Golpaygani
Mohammad-Reza Mahdavi Kani

Mohammad Reza Mirtajodini
Mohammad-Reza Modarresi Yazdi
Mohammad Reza Naseri Yazdi
Mohammad Reza Nekoonam
Mohammed Ridha al-Sistani
Mohammad-Reza Tavassoli

Sadegh Khalkhali
Mohammad Sadeq Rouhani
Mohammad-Sadegh Salehimanesh
Mohammad Sadeqi Tehrani
Mohammad Sadoughi
Seyyed Mohammad Saeedi

Mohammad Shahcheraghi
Mohammad-Taher Shubayr al-Khaqani
Mohammad Taqi al-Modarresi
Mohammad Taqi al-Khoei
Mohammad-Taqi Bahjat Foumani
Mohammad Taghi Falsafi
Mohammad-Taqi Ja'fari
Mohammad-Taghi Khalaji
Mohammad-Taqi Mesbah-Yazdi

Mohammed Taqi Morvarid

Mohammad Taghi Pourmohammadi

Mohammad-Taqi Shoushtari
Mohammad Taghi Vaezi

Mohammad Vaez Mousavi

Mohammad Yazdi
Seyyed Mohammad Ziaabadi

Mohsen Araki
Mohsen Faqihi
Mohsen Heidari Alekasir

Mohsen Kharazi
Mohsen Koochebaghi Tabrizi
Mohsen Mojtahed Shabestari
Mohsin Qara'ati
Mohsen Qomi
Mohsen Rohami

Seyed Mojtaba Hosseini
Mujtaba Musavi Lari
Mojtaba Tehrani
Mojtaba Zonnour

Morteza Aghatehrani

Morteza Moghtadai
Morteza Motahhari

Morteza Sadouqi Mazandarani

Mousa Shubairi Zanjani
Mostafa Boroujerdi

Mostafa Khamenei
Mostafa Khomeini
 
Mostafa Mohaghegh Damad
Mostafa Mousavi Faraz
Mostafa Pourmohammadi

Moslem Malakouti

Nasir Hosseini
Nasrollah Pejmanfar
Nasrallah Shah-Abadi
Naser Makarem Shirazi
Seyed Naser Mousavi Largani

Nematollah Salehi Najafabadi

Qasem Ravanbakhsh
Mir Ghesmat Mosavi Asl
Ghodratollah Alikhani

Ghorbanali Dorri-Najafabadi

Rasul Jafarian
Rasoul Montajabnia

Seyed Reza Bahaadini
Reza Hosseini Nassab
Reza Mohammadi Langroudi
Reza Nouri
Reza Ostadi
Reza Ramezani Gilani

Ruhollah Beigi
Ruhollah Hosseinian
Ruhollah Khatami
Ruhollah Khomeini

Sadeq Larijani
Saied Reza Ameli
Seyed Sajjad Izdehi

Shahab ud-Din Mar'ashi Najafi

Taqi Tabatabaei Qomi

Yadollah Duzduzani

Yahya Nouri
Yasubedin Rastegar Jooybari
Yousef Madani Tabrizi
Yousef Saanei
Yousef Tabatabai Nejad

Zaynolabideen Ghorbani

Sunni Clergy

Abdolhamid Ismaeelzahi
Abdolqader Zahedi

Royalty

Scientists, scholars, and academics

Explorers and travellers

 Ahmad ibn Rustah, 10th-century Persian explorer of Russia, Scandinavia and Arabia
 Naser Khosrow, traveller, writer and poet

Historians, archaeologists and Iranologists

 Abbas Alizadeh
 Abbas Amanat
 Abdolhossein Zarinkoob
 Ahmad Kasravi
 Alireza Shapour Shahbazi
 Badiozzaman Forouzanfar
 Ezzatolah Neghban
 Fereydun Adamiyat
 Hamdallah Mustawfi
 Kaveh Farrokh
 Majid Adibzadeh
 Mehrdad Bahar
 Mohammad Ali Eslami Nodooshan
 Nasser Fakouhi
 Sadegh Malek Shahmirzadi
 Touraj Atabaki
 Touraj Daryaee

Linguists

 Ahmad Karimi-Hakkak
 Ahmad Tafazzoli
 Ali Akbar Abdolrashidi
 Ehsan Yarshater
 Jaleh Amouzgar
 Mehrdad Bahar
 Parviz Natel-Khanlari
 Zabihollah Safa

Intellectuals and philosophers
 See main list: List of pre-modern Iranian scientists and scholars
 See main list: List of contemporary Iranian scientists, scholars, and engineers

 Mirza Fath Ali Akhundzadeh
 Mohammad-Ali Foroughi
 Mostafa Malekian
 Mirza Malkam Khan
 Abbas Milani
 Mohammad Mojtahed Shabestari
 Seyyed Hossein Nasr
 Ali Shariati
 Daryush Shokof
 Sadegh Zibakalam
 Ali Abdolrezaei

Technology and computer engineering

 Shahram Dabiri, lead producer responsible for the massively multiplayer online role-playing game (MMORPG) World of Warcraft
 Dara Khosrowshahi, CEO of Uber, former CEO of Expedia
 Amir Taaki, hacker, computer programmer and early developer for Bitcoin
 Pierre Omidyar, founder of eBay
 Rouzbeh Yassini, Inventor of the Cable Modem
 Habib Zargarpour, visual effects specialist, video game art director

Sports

 Mojtaba Abedini (born 1984), Olympic fencer
Yu Darvish, MLB baseball player for the Texas Rangers
Ariajasuru Hasegawa, professional footballer who plays as an attacking midfielder for Nagoya Grampus
 Ali Azari Karki, footballer
 Sardar Azmoun, soccer player, Iran's National Team player
 Farhad Ghaemi, volleyball player, Iran's National Team player
 Abbas Jadidi, wrestler, Olympic silver medalist
 Abdollah Movahed, wrestler, Olympic gold medalist
 Adel Kolahkaj, football player
 Alex Agase, American football player
 Ali Daei, football player, top international goalscorer, world record holder
 Ali Karimi (footballer, born 1978)
 Ali Karimi (footballer, born 1982)
 Ali Karimi (footballer, born 1994)
 Ali Parvin, football player and coach
 Alireza Dabir, wrestler, Olympic gold medalist
 Alireza Heidari, wrestler, Olympic bronze Mmdalist
 Alireza Rezaei, wrestler, Olympic silver medalist
 Amir Abedzadeh, Iranian Football Player
 Amir Reza Khadem, Olympic Bronze Medalist wrestler
 Andre Agassi, tennis player; his father was Assyrian-Armenian
 Arash Miresmaili, judo world champion
 Aravane Rezaï, tennis player
 Behdad Salimi, weightlifter World Champion
 Ebrahim Javadi, wrestler, Olympic bronze medalist
 Ehsan Ghaemmaghami, chess grandmaster
 Ehsan Hadadi, discus thrower, Asian record holder
 Elshan Moradi, chess grandmaster
 Emamali Habibi Goudarzi, wrestler, first Iranian Olympic gold medalist (Melbourne 1956)
 Emmanuel Agassi, boxer at the 1948 and 1952 Olympics, father of Andre Agassi
 Ezzatollah Pourghaz, Iranian-Turkmen Football Player
 George Issabeg, boxer at the 1948 and 1952 Olympics
 George Malek-Yonan, Iran's Champion of Champions in track & field and pentathlon
 Ghasem Dehnavi, football player
 Ghasem Hadadifar, football player
 Ghasem Rezaei, wrestler
 Hooman Tavakolian, Sport Diplomat and Lobbyist, Hall of Fame, wrestler
 Hossein Rezazadeh, weightlifter, double Olympic champion (Sydney 2000, Athens 2004)
 Javad Nekounam, football player
 Khodadad Azizi, football player
 Kianoush Rostami, weightlifter, world champion
 Kimia Alizadeh, Taekwondo player, the first Iranian woman to win a medal at the Olympic Games (Rio de Janeiro 2016)
 Mahmoud Namjoo, weightlifter, Olympic silver medalist
 Mahyar Monshipour, World Super Bantamweight Boxing Champion
 Navid Ghasemi, BMX racer, cyclist athlete, head coach of national BMX team
 Mansour Bahrami, tennis player
 Mansour Barzegar, wrestler, Olympic silver medalist
 Masoud Jokar, wrestler, Olympic silver medalist
 Mehdi Haghizadeh, football player
 Mehdi Mahdavikia, football player 
 Mehdi Taremi, Iranian Football Player
 Mohammad Ali Fardin, wrestler and actor
 Mohammad Khadem, wrestler
 Mohammad Mousavi, volleyball player
 Mohammad Nassiri, weightlifter, Olympic gold medalist
 Mohammad Reza Heidarian, futsal player
 Mohammad Reza Tupchi, wrestler
 Rahman Rezaei, football player
 Ramin Rezaeian, Iranian Football Player
 Rasoul Khadem, Olympic gold medalist wrestler
 Rouzbeh Cheshmi, Iranian Football Player
 Ruhollah Bigdeli, football player
 Shima Mehri, Motorcycle Biker
 Saeid Marouf, volleyball player
 Shadi Paridar, chess Woman Grandmaster
 Shawn Daivari, professional wrestler
 Shoura Osipov, boxer at 1948 Olympics
 T. J. Houshmandzadeh, NFL player
 Vahid Hashemian, football player
 Yossef Karami, Taekwondo world champion, Olympic bronze medalist
 Andranik Teymourian, football player
 Fereydoon Zandi, football player
 Gholamreza Takhti, wrestler, Olympic gold medalist
 Hadi Saei, taekwondo world champion, Olympic gold medalist
 Hossein Tavakoli, weightlifter, Olympic gold medalist
 Jaber Rouzbahani, basketball player
 Khosrow Vaziri, professional wrestler
 Leila Vaziri, swimmer, World Champion, world record holder
 Vahid Shamsaei, futsal player, top international futsal goalscorer
 Mika Zibanejad, ice hockey player for Ottawa Senators of the NHL
 Daniel Rahimi, ice hockey player for San Jose Sharks of the NHL
 Zabihollah Poursheib, Kurdish Iranian Martial Artist

Iranian women
See separate articles: Persian woman and List of Persian women.

Military

Aviation 

Abbas Doran, fighter pilot
Fereidoon Izadseta, Colonel of the Islamic Republic of Iran Air Force
Houshang Seddigh
Jalil Zandi, fighter pilot
Manouchehr Khosrodad, general
Nader Jahanbani, general, distinguished fighter pilot
Shapour Azarbarzin, fighter pilot

Combat Veterans 

Abbas Ka'bi
Abbas Mohtaj
Ahmad Salek

Alireza Tangsiri
Hassan Ghazizadeh Hashemi
Hassan Hassanzadeh Amoli
Hossein Alaei
Hossein Lashkari
Kavous Seyed-Emami

Mehdi Khazali
Mansour Haghdoust
Mohammad-Ali Rahmani
Mohammad Bagher Ghalibaf
Mohammad Forouzandeh

Mohammad-Hossein Malekzadegan
Mohammad Marandi
Nader Ghazipour
Nasir Hosseini

Sajjad Kouchaki
Shahram Rostami

Generals 

Abdolrahim Mousavi
Ahmad Kazemi
Ahmad Meyghani
Ahmad Reza Pourdastan
Ali Abdollahi
Ali Fadavi
Ali Sayad Shirazi
Ali Shahbazi
Ali Shamkhani
Alireza Afshar
Alireza Sabahifard
Amir Ali Hajizadeh
Ataollah Salehi
Esmaeil Kousari
Esmail Qaani
Farzad Esmaili
Gholam Ali Rashid
Gholamhossein Gheybparvar
Habibollah Sayyari
Hassan Firouzabadi
Hossein Dehghan
Hossein Hassani Sa'di
Hossein Nejat
Hossein Salami
Kioumars Heydari
Mansour Sattari
Mohammad Ali Jafari
Mohammad-Hassan Nami
Mohammad Hejazi
Mohammad-Hossein Dadras
Mohammad Jafar Asadi
Mohammad Pakpour
Mohammad Reza Zahedi
Mohammad Salimi
Mohsen Rezaee
Mostafa Izadi
Nasser Shabani
Qasem-Ali Zahirnejad
Qasem Soleimani
Yahya Rahim Safavi

War Martyrs 

Ahmad Motevasselian
Hamid Taqavi
Hassan Abshenasan
Hasan Aghareb Parast
Hassan Shateri
Hossein Hamadani
Hossein Kharrazi
Hossein Qajeyi
Javad Fakoori
Mehdi Bakeri
Mehdi Zeinoddin
Masoud Monfared Niyaki
Mohammad Ali Allahdadi
Mohammad Boroujerdi
Mohammad Hossein Fahmideh
Mohammad Ebrahim Hemmat
Mohammad Jamali-Paqaleh
Mohsen Gheytaslou
Mohsen Hojaji

Valiollah Fallahi

Misc

 Reza Zadeh, computer science
 Ali Dashti, Iranian senator
 Alireza Afzalipour, businessman and philanthropist; founder of Shahid Bahonar University of Kerman
 Alireza Azmandian, self-help motivational speaker
 Ramezan Hajjimashhadi, lawyer
 Mehran Karimi Nasseri, Iranian refugee who lived in the departure lounge of Terminal One in Charles de Gaulle Airport for many years.
 Zahra Eshraghi, granddaughter of Ayatollah Khomeini and wife of Mohammad Reza Khatami

Afro-Iranians
 Abdolreza Barzegari, footballer
 Abdul Karim Farhani, Iranian Shia Cleric
 Ali Firouzi, footballer and coach
 Mehrab Shahrokhi, footballer
 Mohammad Ali Mousavi Jazayeri, Iranians Shia Cleric (Afro-Ahwazi Arab)
 Shanbehzadeh Ensemble, Iranian folk band
 Dennis Walker, footballer of Afro-Iranian descent, first black player to play for Manchester United

Iranians of Armenian Descent

 Alenush Terian, scientist
 Andranik Eskandarian, footballer
 Andranik Teymourian, footballer
 Andre Agassi, tennis champion
 Arefeh Mansouri, Inventor, Designer
 Arakel of Tabriz, historian
 Armik, flamenco guitarist and composer
 Arsen Minasian, philanthropist, pharmacologist
 Bogdan Saltanov, painter
 Emmanuel Agassi, 1948 and 1952 Olympics boxer representing Iran; father of Andre Agassi
 Gegard Mousasi, MMA fighter
 George Bournoutian, historian
 Haik Hovsepian Mehr, bishop and Christian martyr
 Raffi, prominent writer
 Hayk Bzhishkyan, Soviet military commander
 Hovhannes Masehyan, diplomat and translator
 Hrant Markarian, politician
 Irene Zazians, actress
 Ivan Galamian, violin teacher
 Ivan Lazarevich Lazarev, jeweler
 Khosrow Khan Gorji, influential figure from the Qajar era
 Leon Khachatourian, boxer
 Loris Tjeknavorian, artist
 Marcos Grigorian artist, scholar and actor
 Mirza Malkam Khan, modernist and politician
 Mkhitar Heratsi, physician
 Mushegh Soruri
 Ovannes Ohanian, first Iranian film director
 Robert Beglarian, MP
 Samuel Khachikian, film director
 Sarkis Djanbazian, artist
 Sayat-Nova, poet
 Vartan Gregorian, academic
 Varuzh Karim-Masihi, film editor and director
 Vigen Derderian, singer
 Viguen (see Vigen Derderian)
 Yeprem Khan, revolutionary hero

Iranians of Assyrian descent

 Freydun Atturaya, co-founder of the Assyrian Socialist Party
 George Issabeg, 1948 and 1952 Olympics boxer representing Iran
 George Malek-Yonan, politician and Champion of Champions of Iran
 Issa Benyamin, calligraphist
 Ivan Kakovitch (1933–2006), activist and writer (novel Mount Semele (2001))
 Milton Malek-Yonan, inventor of converted rice
 Paulus Khofri, composer and painter
 Ramona Amiri, Miss Canada 2005
 Shoura Osipov, 1948 Olympics boxer representing Iran
 Shoura Osipov, Olympic boxer
 Mar Youhannan Semaan Issayi, Archbishop of Assyro-Chaldean Metropolitan Tehran

Emigrants and immigrants

Americans in Iran

 Howard Baskerville, Iran's first American martyr
 Joseph Gallup Cochran, American missionary in Urmia and Seer, translator
 Joseph Plumb Cochran, second-generation American missionary in Urmia and medical doctor; established first Iranian medical college
 Arthur Millspaugh, Treasury General, Persia
 Arthur Upham Pope (1881–1969) and Phyllis Ackerman (1893–1977), Persian culture revivalists, scholars of Persian art and architecture history
 David Stronach
 Elgin Groseclose, Treasury General, Persia
 John Limbert
 Justin Perkins, first American resident of Iran (1835), Presbyterian missionary in Urmia.
 Morgan Shuster, Treasury General, Persia
 Richard Nelson Frye (1920–2014), former Harvard University professor, scholar of Persian art history
 Samuel M. Jordan, namesake of Jordan Ave. in Tehran
 William M. Miller

Germans in Iran

 Annemarie Schimmel, German-born Harvard expert on Iranian literature
 Wilhelm Wassmuss, German diplomat, spy and military hero, Iran, World War I

Iranians in America
See separate article: List of Iranian Americans.

Iranians in Canada
See article: Iranian-Canadian

Iranians in Britain
List of British Iranians

Iranians in Germany
Iranians in Germany

Iranians in Australia
Iranian Australian

Iranians in the Netherlands
Iranians in the Netherlands

Iranians in Sweden
Iranians in Sweden

Iranians in Egypt

 Tahia Kazem, wife of president Gamal Abdel Nasser; born in Egypt to Iranian parents

Iranians in Pakistan

 Nusrat Bhutto, Iranian father and mother moved with family to Karachi, British India, before partition; married Zulfikar Ali Bhutto; father of Benazir Bhutto

Persian Roman Catholic saints
See article List of Persian Roman Catholic saints

See also

 List of Iran-related topics
 List of people by nationality
 Iranian peoples

References